The Bishop of Kensington is an episcopal title used by an area bishop of the Church of England Diocese of London, in the Province of Canterbury, England. The Bishop of Kensington is responsible for a part of Greater London, including Kensington, Hounslow, Hampton, Hammersmith and Fulham, plus the Spelthorne district in Surrey.

In February 1903, the first bishop received care of the rural deaneries of Westminster, Hampton, and Uxbridge from assistant bishop Alfred Barry, who had in turn taken over responsibility for "West London" from the Bishop of Marlborough in 1900. In 1906, Ridgeway moved to a house on Cornwall Gardens, South Kensington. In the experimental area scheme of 1970, the bishop was given oversight of the deaneries of Kensington, Chelsea, Hammersmith, Hampton, Staines and Hounslow. The bishops suffragan of Kensington have been area bishops since the London area scheme was founded in 1979.

Emma Ineson became Bishop of Kensington upon swearing the oaths at a service on 19 February 2023.

List of bishops

References

External links
 Crockford's Clerical Directory - Listings

Bishops of Kensington
Kensington
Christianity in London